Isang Dakot na Luha  (One Handful of Tears) is a Philippine afternoon drama series topbilled by Alice Dixson, Danita Paner, Jay Manalo and Glydel Mercado, broadcast on TV5 and started airing on February 27, 2012.

The series is all about a story of a mother, in her struggle to keep her children from being taken away from her, needs to deal with unfortunate circumstances. Amelia played by Alice Dixson and Mario played by Jay Manalo, an ill-fated couple who get estranged from each other and will soon lose their three children.

The Series also premieres with the afternoon launch of Felina: Prinsesa ng mga Pusa.

The Series rerun on The 5 Network every Monday at 4:30-6:30 PM.

Synopsis
The San Diegos are a poor but happy family raised by the good couple, Amelia and Mario with their three daughters; Angela, Almira and Mirasol. They lived with Mario's stepmother, Lucing, who secretly maltreated Amelia. Because of their debts, Mario decided to find a job and work in Manila where he met Veronica Vergara, a prominent and wealthy heiress of Mr. Vergara's fortune. Veronica falls in love with Mario.  She seduces him and plans to have him as her husband. When Veronica finds out about Mario's family, she plans to destroy them with the help of Mario's evil stepmother Lucing as an accomplice.

Amelia decided to work abroad to support their needs but this made her fall in Veronica's trap. She was hostaged by an illegal employer for several years. Angela, Almira and Pangga was left to Amelia's bestfriend Edna but an accident led Edna's death after she saved Almira from getting hit by a vehicle. The poor little San Diegos were left to Lucing where they were maltreated. Veronica apprenticed Lucing to change Amelia's good image to her children.

Amelia and Mario's daughters fate which is to separate from each other faced them. Time came when Veronica's daughter Lyla died and because she wanted to have a child again she decided to have Almira. Pangga was separated from Angela and was left to Helga, a Chinese businesswoman who adopted her. Angela was then left alone with resentment against her mother who she knew was the cause of the ruin and misfortune their family obtained.

Cast and characters

Main cast
 Alice Dixson as Amelia San Diego/Amelis Reyes
 Danita Paner as Angela San Diego
 Jay Manalo as Mario San Diego
 Glydel Mercado as Veronica Vergara-San Diego
 Lianne Valentin as Almira
 Junyka Santarin as Pangga/Ging-ging

Supporting cast
 Karel Marquez as Bernadette
 Daria Ramirez as Lucing
 Jenny Miller as Fiona
 Edgar Allan Guzman as Miguel 
 Elvis Gutierrez as Ronan
 Nikka Valencia as Edna
 Sheryl Cruz as Helga 
 January Isaac as Mona
 Leandro Baldemor as Carlo

Guest cast
 Celine Lim as Young Angela
 Melzen Aquino as Young Almira
 Kimberly Fulgar as Rhodora
 Mary Roldan as Isabelle

International broadcast

See also
List of programs broadcast by TV5 (Philippines)
List of programs aired by TV5 (Philippines)

References

TV5 (Philippine TV network) drama series
2012 Philippine television series debuts
2012 Philippine television series endings
Philippine drama television series
Filipino-language television shows